The Australorp is a chicken breed of Australian origin, developed as a utility breed with a focus on egg laying and is famous for laying more than 300 eggs. It achieved world-wide popularity in the 1920s after the breed broke numerous world records for number of eggs laid and has been a popular breed in the western world since. It is one of eight poultry breeds created in Australia and recognised by the Australian Poultry Standards. The most popular colour of the breed is black, which is the only colour recognised in the United States of America, but blue and white are also recognised in Australia and the Poultry Club South Africa recognises buff, splash, wheaten laced and golden in addition.

History
The original stock used in the development of the Australorp was imported to Australia from England out of the Black Orpington yards of William Cook and Joseph Partington in the period from 1890 to the early 1900s with Rhode Island Red. Local breeders used this stock together with judicious out-crossings of Minorca, White Leghorn and Langshan blood to improve the utility features of the imported Orpingtons. There is even a report of some Plymouth Rock blood also being used. The emphasis of the early breeders was on utility features. At this time, the resulting birds were known as Australian Black Orpingtons (Austral-orp).

The origin of the name "Australorp" seems to be shrouded in as much controversy as the attempts to obtain agreement between the States over a suitable national Standard. The earliest claim to the name was made by one of poultry fancy's institutions, Wiliam Wallace Scott, before the First World War. From 1925 Wal Scott set to work to have Australorp recognised as a breed with the Poultry Society as he developed the breed. Equally as persuasive a claim came in 1919 from Arthur Harwood who suggested that the "Australian Laying Orpingtons" be named "Australs". The letters "orp" were suggested as a suffix to denote the major breed in the fowl's development. A further overseas claim to the name came from Britain's W. Powell-Owen who drafted the British Standard for the breed in 1921 following the importation of the "Australian Utility Black Orpingtons." It is certain that the name "Australorp" was being used in the early 1920s when the breed was launched internationally.  In 1929, the Australorp was admitted to the Standard of Perfection.

Characteristics 
There are both bantam and standard sized Australorps.

The Australorp has three recognised colours according to the Australian Poultry Standard: black, white and blue. White Australorps have been recorded since 1949 but they were only recognised in the second edition of the Australian Poultry Standards in 2011. The Poultry Club South Africa recognises four further colours: buff, splash, wheaten laced and golden.

Eggs
It was the egg-laying performance of Australorps that attracted world attention when in 1922–1923 a team of six hens set a world record by laying 1857 eggs for an average of 309.5 eggs per hen during a 365 consecutive day trial. These figures were achieved without the lighting regimens of the modern intensive shed. Such performances had importation orders flooding in from England, United States of America, South Africa, Canada and Mexico.  Well looked after Australorps lay approximately 250 light-brown eggs per year. A new record was set when a hen laid 364 eggs in 365 days. They are also known to be good nest sitters and mothers, making them one of the most popular large heritage utility breeds of chicken.

References

Further reading 
 Alanna Moore (1998). Backyard Poultry—Naturally. Bolwarrah, Victoria, Australia: Bolwarrah Press. 

Animal breeds on the RBST Watchlist
Chicken breeds
Chicken breeds originating in Australia